GHK may refer to:
 Gahcho Kue Aerodrome, in the Northwest Territories, Canada
 Geko Karen, a language of Burma
 GHK algorithm, a regression model
 Ghotki railway station, in Pakistan
 Glasgow High Kelvinside, a Scottish rugby union club
 Goldman–Hodgkin–Katz flux equation
 Goldman–Hodgkin–Katz voltage equation
 Gush Katif Airport, in the Gaza Strip
 Wood and Plastic Union, a former German trade union